Yu with diaeresis (Ю̈ ю̈; italics: Ю̈ ю̈) is a letter of the Cyrillic script.

Yu with diaeresis is used in the Selkup (and formerly in the Karelian) languages.

See also
Cyrillic characters in Unicode

Cyrillic letters with diacritics
Letters with diaeresis